Qufu is a city in southwestern Shandong province, East China. Qufu has an area of 815 square kilometers, and a total population of 653,000 inhabitants, of which, 188,000 live in urban areas.

Qufu is best known as the hometown of Confucius, who is traditionally believed to have been born at nearby Mount Ni. The city contains numerous historic palaces, temples and cemeteries. The three most famous cultural sites of the city, collectively known as San Kong (are the Temple of Confucius, the Cemetery of Confucius, and the Kong Family Mansion. Together, these three sites have been listed as a UNESCO World Heritage Site since 1994.

Etymology
The name Qufu literally means "crooked hill", and refers to a mile-long hill that was part of the city during its time as capital of the state of Lu.

Administrative divisions 
The city of Qufu is divided into 4 subdistricts, and 8 towns. The city government is located within .

History

During the Shang, the area around Qufu was home to the people of Yan, who were counted by the Chinese among the "Eastern Barbarians" or Dongyi. Along with Pugu (around Binzhou) and Xu (along the Huai River), Yan joined the Shang prince Wu Geng and the Three Guards in their failed rebellion against the Duke of Zhou BC. After the rebels' defeat, the Duke launched punitive campaigns against the Dongyi, forcing their submission and placing their territory under loyal nobles. The territory of the Yan became part of the state of Lu, who made Qufu their capital throughout the Spring and Autumn period. This city had walls considerably larger than the present Ming-era fortifications, including more land to the east and north.

During the Tang dynasty and the early days of the Song dynasty the city was centered around the present-day Temple of Duke Zhou, at the northeastern corner of today's walled city. A temple in honor of the Yellow Emperor was built there; all that remains today are two giant stelae (the Shou Qiu site).

After the conquest of the northern China by the Jurchens, the new Jin dynasty renamed Xianyuan back to Qufu (in 1142), but the city stayed at its Song location. It was not until the reign of the Jiajing Emperor of the Ming dynasty (1522) that the present-day city wall was built. The site of the city in 1012–1522 is now Jiuxian Village.

During the Southern Song dynasty the descendant of Confucius at Qufu, the Duke Yansheng Kong Duanyou fled south with the Song Emperor to Quzhou in Zhejiang, while the newly established Jin dynasty (1115–1234) in the north appointed Kong Duanyou's brother Kong Duancao who remained in Qufu as Duke Yansheng. From that time up until the Yuan dynasty, there were two Duke Yanshengs, one in the north in Qufu and the other in the south at Quzhou. An invitation to come back to Qufu was extended to the southern Duke Yansheng Kong Zhu by the Yuan dynasty emperor Kublai Khan. The title was taken away from the southern branch after Kong Zhu rejected the invitation, so the northern branch of the family kept the title of Duke Yansheng. The southern branch still remained in Quzhou where they lived to this day. Confucius's descendants in Quzhou alone number 30,000. The Hanlin Academy rank of Wujing boshi 五經博士 was awarded to the southern branch at Quzhou by a Ming emperor while the northern branch at Qufu held the title Duke Yansheng. Kong Ruogu, also known as Kong Chuan 47th generation was claimed to be the ancestor of the Southern branch after Kong Zhu died by Northern branch member Kong Guanghuang.

In 1948, Qufu played a minor role in the Yanzhou Campaign of the Chinese Civil War.

The artifacts of the historical sites at Qufu suffered extensive damage during the Cultural Revolution when about 200 staff members and students of Beijing Normal University led by Tan Houlan (1937–1982), one of the five most powerful student leaders of the Cultural Revolution, came to Qufu and destroyed more than 6000 artifacts in November 1966.

Before the wide adoption of Pinyin, the name of the city (often viewed as a county seat, i.e. Qufu xian) was transcribed in English in a variety of ways, such as Ch'ü-fou-hien, Kio-feu-hien, Kio-fou-hien,
Kiu-fu,
Kiuh Fow, Keuhfow, Kufow, and Chufou.

Geography
The small historical center of Qufu is surrounded by the restored Ming-era city wall and rivers/moats. The Drum Tower (Gulou) is in the center of the walled city; the Temple of Confucius (Kong Miao), Confucius Mansion (Kong Fu) and the Temple of Yan Hui (Yan Miao) occupy large sections of the land within the wall.

The modern downtown is located south of the walled city. There is also a mosque and a thriving Muslim neighborhood and market that is located just outside the west gate of the walled city.

The Qufu train station and major industrial areas are on the east side, a few kilometers east of the historical city. The Shaohao Tomb and Shou Qiu historical site (the purported birthplace of the legendary Yellow Emperor), are on the eastern outskirts of the modern Qufu as well, near Jiuxian village.

The Si River and the  both pass through the city.

Climate 

Transportation

Rail transport 
The original Beijing–Shanghai Railway, constructed in the early 20th century, passes through Qufu.

The Yanshi Railway, which connects Yanzhou and Rizhao as part of the broader Xinshi Railway, passes through the city. A small passenger station operating on the southeast side of the city serves this line.

The Beijing–Shanghai High-Speed Railway, which opened in 2011, runs through Qufu. This line's Qufu East Railway Station is located a few kilometers south-east of the city.

In 2015, plans were announced for the construction of a high-speed line from Qufu via Linyi to Huai'an within the next few years. If this project in implemented, it will make Qufu East a junction station.

Road transport 
China National Highway 104 and China National Highway 327 both pass through Qufu.

Monorail 
A , 12 station monorail to connect Qufu and Zoucheng began construction in the first half of 2017, however construction was halted. A  section was due to be completed in January 2018 to allow for testing to commence. The complete line was originally due to open in 2018. As of July 2021 the local government hopes to complete the line.

Temple of Confucius (Kong Miao)

Within two years after the death of Confucius, his former house in Qufu was already consecrated as a temple by the Duke of Lu. In 205 BC, Emperor Liu Bang of the Han dynasty was the first emperor to offer sacrifices to the memory of Confucius in Qufu. He set an example for many emperors and high officials to follow. Later, emperors would visit Qufu after their enthronement or on important occasions such as a successful war. In total, 12 different emperors paid 20 personal visits to Qufu to worship Confucius. About 100 others sent their deputies for 196 official visits. The original three-room house of Confucius was removed from the temple complex during a rebuilding undertaken in 611 AD. In 1012 and in 1094, during the Song dynasty, the temple was extended into a design with three sections and four courtyards, around which eventually more than 400 rooms were arranged. Fire and vandalism destroyed the temple in 1214, during the Jin dynasty. It was restored to its former extent by the year 1302 during the Yuan dynasty. Shortly thereafter, in 1331, the temple was framed in an enclosure wall modelled on the Imperial palace. After another devastation by fire in 1499, the temple was finally restored to its present scale. In 1724, yet another fire destroyed the main hall and the sculptures it contained. The subsequent restoration was completed in 1730. Many of the replacement sculptures were again destroyed during the Cultural Revolution in 1966. In total, the Temple of Confucius has undergone 15 major renovations, 31 large repairs, and numerous small building measures.

Because the last major redesign following the fire in 1499 took place shortly after the building of the Forbidden City in the Ming dynasty, the architecture of the Temple of Confucius resembles that of the Forbidden City in many ways. The first three courtyards have small gates and are planted with tall pine trees, they serve an introductory function. The first (southernmost) gate is named "Lingxing Gate" after a star in the Great Bear constellation, the name suggests that Confucius is a star from heaven. The buildings in the remaining courtyards form the heart of the complex. They are impressive structures with yellow roof-tiles (otherwise reserved for the emperor) and red-painted walls, they are surrounded by dark-green pine trees to create a color contrast with complementary colors. The main buildings are the Stele Pavilions (e.g., Jin and Yuan dynasties, 1115–1368), the Kuiwen Hall (built in 1018, restored in 1504 during the Ming dynasty and in 1985), the Xing Tan Pavilion (Apricot Platform), the De Mu Tian Di Arch, the Dacheng Hall (built in the Qing dynasty), and the Hall of Confucius' Wife. The Dacheng Hall (Great Perfection Hall) is the architectural center of the present day complex.

The ten columns on the front side of the hall are decorated with coiled dragons. It is said that these columns were covered during visits by the emperor in order not to arouse his envy. Dacheng Hall served as the principal place for offering sacrifices to the memory of Confucius. In the center of the courtyard in front of Dacheng Hall stands the "Apricot Platform", which commemorates Confucius teaching his students under an apricot tree. Each year at Qufu and at many other Confucian temples a ceremony is held on September 28 to commemorate Confucius' birthday.

Cemetery of Confucius (Kong Lin)

The Cemetery of Confucius lies to the north of the town of Qufu. The oldest graves found in this location date back to the Zhou dynasty. The original tomb erected here in memory of Confucius on the bank of the Sishui River had the shape of an axe. In addition, it had a brick platform for sacrifices. The present-day tomb is a cone-shaped hill. Tombs for the descendants of Confucius and additional stela to commemorate him were soon added around Confucius' tomb.

Since Confucius' descendants were conferred noble titles and were given imperial princesses as wives, many of the tombs in the cemetery show the status symbols of noblemen. Tombstones came in use during the Han dynasty, today, there are about 3,600 tombstones dating from the Song, Yuan, Ming and Qing dynasties still standing in the cemetery.

In 1331 construction work began on the wall and gate of the cemetery. In total, the cemetery has undergone 13 renovations and extensions. In this space, the tombs of more than 100,000 descendants of Confucius, who have been buried there over a period of about 2000 years, can be found. The oldest graves date back to the Zhou dynasty, the most recent of which belong to descendants in the 76th and 78th generation.

During the Cultural Revolution, the Kong family cemetery was branded a "reactionary" site and was subject to vandalism and desecration. The tombs of Confucius and his descendants were dug up, looted and flattened. Confucius statue was pulled down and paraded through the streets. According to statistics published after the Cultural Revolution, 100,000 volumes of classical texts were burned, 6,618 cultural artefacts were destroyed or damaged, one thousand stelae were smashed, 5,000 ancient pines were felled and over 2,000 graves were dug up during the period. 
The corpse of the 76th Duke of Qufu was removed from its grave, hung naked from a tree in front of the palace and later incinerated.

More than 10,000 mature trees give the cemetery a forest-like appearance. A road runs from the north gate of Qufu to the exterior gate of the cemetery in a straight line. Along this road lies the Yan Temple, dedicated to Confucius' favorite student.

Kong Family Mansion (Kong Fu)

The direct descendants of Confucius lived in the Kong family Mansion located to the east of the temple. They were in charge of tending to the temple and cemetery. In particular, they were in charge of conducting elaborate religious ceremonies on occasions such as plantings, harvests, honoring the dead, and birthdays. The Kong family was in control of the largest private rural estate in China. The first mansion was built in 1038 during the Song dynasty and was originally connected directly to the temple. During a rebuilding in 1377 directed by the first Ming dynasty emperor, it was moved a short distance away from the temple. In 1503, it was expanded into three rows of buildings with 560 rooms and—like the Confucius Temple—9 courtyards. The mansion underwent a complete renovation in 1838 only to perish in a fire 47 years later in 1887. It was rebuilt two years later; the cost of both 19th-century renovations was covered by the Emperor. Its tallest structure is the four-story refuge tower that was designed as a shelter during an attack but was never used. The family mansion was inhabited by descendants of Confucius until 1937, when Confucius' descendant in the 76th and 77th generations fled to Chongqing during the Second Sino-Japanese War and later during the Chinese Civil War to Taiwan, where the head of the family still resides.

The layout of the mansion is traditionally Chinese, it separates official rooms in the front from the residential quarters in the rear. Furthermore, the spatial distribution of the buildings according to the seniority, gender, and status of their inhabitants reflects the Confucian principle of order and hierarchy: The most senior descendant of Confucius took up residence in the central of the three main buildings; his younger brother occupied the Yi Gun hall to the east.

Economy
Qufu's economy consists of a number different industries. Agriculture, specifically grain production, is a major industry for the city. The other main industries are food processing, textile, construction materials, chemical, coal mining, pharmacy, paper making and industrial machinery. Qufu has also benefited greatly from tourism, holding a number of cultural festivals and exhibitions, largely centered around Confucius.

Natural resources 
The city's main mineral deposits include coal, phosphorus, and limestone.

Education
Qufu Normal University is located in Qufu city, and has an additional campus in Rizhao. The university, founded in 1955, offers 87 undergraduate majors, 25 master's degrees, and 11 doctoral degrees.

Religion
Qufu is a traditional centre of Confucianism, being the area where Confucius was born. The city is home to the holiest Temple of Confucius, to the Mausoleum of Confucius and to the Mansion of the Kong Family. The city also has a branch of the Holy Church of Confucius and hosts the headquarters of the Federation of Confucian Culture.

Gallery

See also
Mount Ni, traditionally believed to be the site of the birth of Confucius
Zoucheng, hometown of Mencius
 Qu (surname 曲), many people with this surname are from Shandong.

Notes

References

External links

 
UNESCO World Heritage Listing
CCTV
Qufu Normal University
Asian Historical Architecture: Qufu
Panoramic photo of Confucius Temple
Photographs of a Confucian Temple ceremony
Confucian website
A photo tour of Qufu from 2008 

 
World Heritage Sites in China
Jining
Cities in Shandong
County-level divisions of Shandong